The 2015 Golden Icons Academy Movie Awards was the 4th edition of the ceremony. The event was held on October 17, 2015 in Houston, Texas. It was hosted by Nigerian comedian, Ayo Makun.

Awards

Best Motion Picture
Love Regardless
Stalker
Stigma
Black November
Trials of Igho
Matters Arising

Best Film (Drama)
Stigma
The Changer
Invasion 1897
Ojuju
Oge's Sister
After the "I Do's"
Stalker

Best Film (Comedy)
Jack and Jill
Headgone
Horn Free Day
My American Son
Broni Wawu
When Love Comes Around

Best Short Film
Verdict
Once
The Throne
Horn Free Day
Henna

Best Film (foreign language)
 Mr Bf
 Torera
Ojuju
Made in Agege
Iya Alalake

Best Actor
Frederick Leonard – Keeping Secrets
Hakeem Kae-Kazim - Black November
Majid Michel - Matters Arising
Jim Iyke - Stalker
Mike Omoregbe - Invasion 1897
Ken Erics - Trials of Igho
Clem Ohameze - My American SonBest Actress
Adesua Etomi - Falling (film)Uche Jombo - Oge's SisterIni Edo - While You SleptMbong Amata - Black NovemberJackie Appiah - StigmaNse Ikpe-Etim - Stalker
Ruth Kadiri - Matters ArisingBest Supporting male
Anthony Monjaro - StalkerDesmond Finney - ReflectionsSeun Akindele - The ChangerChigozie Atuanya - JafarMelvin Oduah - Trials of IghoOC Ukeje - Black November
James Gardiner - Happy DeathdayBest Supporting female 
Kiki Omeili - Sting
Yvonne Jegede - Oge's SisterCaroline Danjuma - StalkerAyo Adesanya - The Good WifeVenita Akpofure - While You Slept Tana Adelana - The Kingdom Eku Edewor - When Love Comes AroundBest Comedic Act
Roselyn Ngissah - Jack and JillAkpororo - Headgone co-winners
Nkansah Kwadwo - Made in AgegeKelechi Udegbe - Horn-free Day 
Fathia Balogun - Iya AlalakeLydia Forson - A Letter from Adam Eniola Badmus - Headgone co-winners

Best New Actor
Gbenga Titiloye - Love Regardless
Stoneboy - Happy DeathdayJeff Kumordzi - Letter from AdamAkpororo - HeadgoneKunle Oluremi - StingIso Paeley - Love RegardlessBest New Actress
Aisha Kamara - Reflections
Princess Okah - The ChangerYvonne Okyere - Love RegardlessRosemary Zimu - ChampagneEmem Inwang - StalkerComfort Idongesit - Trials of IghoNsikan Isaac - The BankerBest On-screen duo
Ruth Kadri and Majid Michel - Matters ArisingKen Erics and Kiki Omeili - Trials of IghoBlossom Chukwujekwu and Adesua Etomi - Falling (film)Gbenga Titiloye and Zynnel Lydia Zuh - Love RegardlessNse Ikpe-Etim and Jim Iyke - Stalker 
Yvonne Jegede and Uche Jombo - Oge's Sister

 Best Editing 
 Kpians by Stanlee Ohikhuare
 When Love Comes Around Matters Arising by Nwaogburu Nelson
 Verdict by Stanlee Ohikhuare
 Ojuju by CJ Obasi Love Regardless by Muyiwa Aluko
 Black November

Best Sound
 Kpians by Stanlee Ohikhuare Invasion 1897
 The Throne by Keneth Ononeze
 Black November
 The Antique by Cobhams Asuquo and Darasen Richards
 Ojuju by Dayo Thompson
 Made in Agege by Kenneth Yeboah

Best Makeup/Costume
 Jafar by Nwagboso and Elechenu 
 Ojuju by Adefunke Olowo
 Made in Agege by Evans, Yeboah & Poku
 Stalker by Udonquak
 Kpians by Edwin-Okon
 When Love Comes Around
 Invasion 1897Best CinematographyBlack NovemberOjujuInvasion 1897VerdictHorn-Free DayShattered RomanceKpiansBest ScreenplayStigmaTrials of IghoShattered RomanceStingHeadgoneRequiteStalkerBest ProducerOjuju by Oge Obasi.Invasion 1897 by Lancelot ImaseunHeadgone by FasisiBlack November by Jeta AmataJafar by Ezugwu

Best Director
Trials of Igho by Chris Eneng Enaji
Invasion 1897 by Lancelot Imaseun
Stalker by Moses Inwang
Love Regardless by Muyiwa AlukoBlack November by Jeta AmataThe Changer by Ejim Fortune Kezi
Headgone by Dare Fasisi

Best Film (Diaspora)
Red Rose
The Portrait
Affairs of the HeartLAPD African CopsBest Screenplay (Diaspora)Red RoseThe PortraitRetaliationThe FlawsBloodline BattleAffairs of the HeartLAPD African CopsBest Director (Diaspora)Affairs of the Heart by Robert PetersThe Portrait by John Uche
Bloodline Battle by AB Sallu
Red Rose by Kingsley Ukaegbu
LAPD African Cops by Pascal Atumah

Best Actor (Diaspora)
Moses Efret - Red Rose
Carl Payne - The Flaws
Kyle Burgess - The PortraitPascal Atumah - LAPD African Cops co-winners
Joseph Benjamin (actor) - Affairs of the Heart co-winners

Best Actress (Diaspora)
Oge Okoye - Red RoseBerlinda Nahbila - The PortraitQueen Esther Imar - Bloodline BattleStella Damasus - Affairs of the Heart
Pridin B. Fru - Retaliation 
Best Male (Viewers choice)
John Dumelo
Alexx Ekubo
Van Vicker
Uti Nwachukwu
Blossom Chukwujekwu
Majid Michel
OC Ukeje

Best Female (Viewers choice)
Adesua Etomi
Uche Jombo
Belinda Effah
Ruth Kadiri
Ini Edo 
Yvonne Nelson

Best Comedic Act (Viewers choice)
Francis Odega co-winners
Julius Agwu co-winners
Funke Akindele
Lydia Forson
Eniola Badmus
Roseyln Ngissah
Akpororo

Foreign International Act (male) 
Wyclef Jean - Black NovemberDorien Wilson - LAPD African CopsAkon - Black November
Mickey Rourke - Black NovemberForeign International Act (female) 
Sarah Wayne Callies - Black NovemberLuenell - LAPD African Cops
Vanessa Bell Calloway - LAPD African CopsKim Basinger - Black November''

Lifetime Achievement Award
Clarion Chukwura

GIAMA Song of the Year
"Godwin" by Korede Bello

References
    

2015 in Nigerian cinema
Nollywood